Maréchal de Belleisle was a 46-gun fourth-rate frigate of the French Navy built in 1757. Captained by François Thurot she was captured in 1760.

A memorial to the battle, called Mount Æolus, consisting of two cannons and the bowsprit of Maréchal de Belleisle, which washed ashore on the Manx coast near Bishopscourt, was built in the grounds of Bishopscourt, Isle of Man. The wooden bowsprit was later replaced by an inscribed stone pillar.

References

External links
 

Ships built in France
Maritime incidents in 1760
1757 ships